Ziyovuddin is an urban-type settlement in Samarqand Region, Uzbekistan. It is the capital of Paxtachi District. The town population in 1989 was 10,160 people.

Notable people
Server Mustafayev – Crimean Tatar human rights defender and coordinator of the civil rights organization Crimean Solidarity

References

Populated places in Samarqand Region
Urban-type settlements in Uzbekistan